Stan Magro (born 28 July 1954) is a former Australian rules footballer who played with the Collingwood Football Club in the VFL.  He also played for South Fremantle and East Perth in the WAFL.

Remembered as one of the game's finest tacklers, Magro played in three losing Grand Finals over six seasons for the Magpies, including the 1977 draw & 1979 thriller.

After retiring from playing football, he began a career in coaching.  Initially he coached South Fremantle for four seasons and then East Perth for two in the WAFL before becoming an assistant coach for Collingwood.  He then moved back to Western Australia to become an assistant coach for Fremantle Football Club, who sacked him in 1998 when Damian Drum replaced Gerard Neesham as senior coach.  In 2005 Magro sued three directors of the club, Gerard McNeill, David Hatt and Ross Kelly and the club itself for $200,000 in lost earnings and damages. He was awarded $43,000 by the courts, but this was later overturned on appeal, although an undisclosed out of court settlement was paid.  Magro returned to WAFL coaching in 2001, leading the Perth Football Club for five seasons.

Between 2010 and 2012, Magro was the coach of Myrtleford Football Club in the Ovens & Murray Football League.

References

External links 
 
 

Living people
1954 births
South Fremantle Football Club players
Collingwood Football Club players
East Perth Football Club players
South Fremantle Football Club coaches
East Perth Football Club coaches
Perth Football Club coaches
Western Australian State of Origin players
Australian rules footballers from Western Australia